Semachidae or Semachidai was a deme of ancient Athens, in the district of Epacria.

The site of Semachidae is tentatively located near modern Vredou.

References

Ancient Athens
Populated places in ancient Attica
Former populated places in Greece
Demoi